Protosiren eothene is a species of Lutetian sirenian, found in the upper part of the Habib Rahi Formation, Pakistan.

References

Eocene mammals of Asia
Eocene sirenians